K.G.F: Chapter 1 is the soundtrack album of the 2018 Indian period action film of the same name. Ravi Basrur composed the film's score and also for its sequel, K.G.F: Chapter 2. The score was recorded in over three years, and several musicians and orchestras, across the world, had attributed to the film score and music. The Tamil, Telugu, Malayalam and Kannada versions of the album, were released by Lahari Music on 7 December 2018, whereas the Hindi version's soundtrack, marketed by T-Series, released two days later. Lyricists for the film songs are: Dr. V. Nagendra Prasad, Kinnal Raj and Basrur (Kannada), Prasad and Mohammed Aslam (Hindi), Kabilan and Madhurakavi (Tamil), Ramajogayya Sastry (Telugu) and Sudamsu (Malayalam).

Development 

Ravi Basrur composed the songs and the background score, in his second collaboration with Prashanth Neel, after Ugramm (2014). The composition and recording of the film's music took more than three years, and about 400 musicians from various parts of the world, 20 sound producers and prominent orchestras working on the score cues, increased anticipation around the film's music. In order to experiment with the score, Basrur had composed the tunes mostly through keyboard. He added that the score will be "on par with Hollywood standards" and had met Hollywood technicians and record producers for the score. He further added, "The cinematographer [Bhuvan Gowda] and I have worked closely to ensure there’s a sync in ideas of the director. Even though I have done very few films, I feel that sound designing plays a prominent role".

Release 
Lahari Music bought the audio rights of Kannada, Tamil, Telugu and Malayalam versions of the soundtrack album for a record sum of  beating the previous record of Baahubali 2: The Conclusion, whereas the soundtrack album of its Hindi version were acquired by T-Series. 

The track "Salaam Rocky Bhai" was served as the lead single from the soundtrack album. It was released in Kannada, Tamil, Telugu and Malayalam on 7 December 2018, along with the full soundtrack album; whereas the album for the Hindi version was released on 9 December 2018. The lyrical version of the song crossed 2.3 million views and received good response from the audience.

Tanishk Bagchi recreated the song "Gali Gali" from the 1989 film Tridev (composed by Kalyanji–Anandji and written by Anand Bakshi), for the Hindi version of the soundtrack. The single which was sung by Neha Kakkar with additional lyrics by Rashmi Virag, was released on 13 December 2018. Basrur also re-created Upendra Kumar's "Jokae" from the 1970 film Paropakari, (originally written by Chi. Udayashankar and R. N. Jayagopal and sung by L. R. Eswari), with the recreated version sung by Airaa Acharya. It was released as a single on 15 December 2018 in all dubbed languages. D. Imman provided an additional number and karaoke versions of the songs, which has been individually released in a separate album on 27 December 2018.

Track listing

Kannada

Hindi

Tamil

Telugu

Malayalam

Background score 
All music is composed and conducted by Ravi Basrur.

References

Kannada film soundtracks
Hindi film soundtracks
2018 soundtrack albums